Vidya Prasarak Mandal's (V.P.M.'s) Polytechnic is an institute for technical education in Thane, Maharashtra, India. It was founded in 1983, by Vidya Prasarak Mandal (VPM), Thane, a public education trust. The late Dr. V.N. Bedekar is one of the founding members of this institute. V.P.M.'s Polytechnic produces skilled technicians.
In 1956, the birth centenary year of Lokmanya Tilak, a young doctor named DR. V. N.Bedekar from Vile Parle started his practice in Thane. Inspired by Lokmanya's efforts in academic field, he joined Vidya Prasarak Mandal and soon became its president. 
He dreamed of creating an "Island Of Knowledge" (Janyandweepa) in Thane. Until his death (at the age of 85), he guided the institute. After his death, his son Dr. Vijay Bedekar became the President.

Location
The four buildings cover a sprawling area of over 6700 m2 with a workshop of 300 m2.
Since inception in 1983, and subsequent recognition by All India Council for Technical Education (AICTE), the institute has grown firmly. It is the first Self Financing polytechnic in the Mumbai sub region to receive accreditation to four eligible diploma programs by the National Board of Accreditation in New Delhi.

Courses offered

Undergraduate (Diploma)
 Instrumentation Engineering
 Electrical Power Systems
 Industrial Electronics
 Information Technology
 Computer Engineering

Postgraduate diploma
 Advanced Diploma in Computer Software System Analysis and Applications (ADCSSAA)
 Advanced Diploma in Industrial Safety (ADIS)
 Post Diploma Course in Computer Maintenance Engineering

Universities and colleges in Maharashtra
Education in Thane
Educational institutions established in 1983
1983 establishments in Maharashtra